Attitudes in Ireland towards lesbian, gay, bisexual, and transgender (LGBT) people are among the most liberal in the world. Ireland is notable for its transformation from a country holding overwhelmingly conservative attitudes toward LGBT issues, in part due to the opposition by the Roman Catholic Church, to one holding overwhelmingly liberal views in the space of a generation. In May 2015, Ireland became the first country to legalise same-sex marriage on a national level by popular vote. The New York Times declared that the result put Ireland at the "vanguard of social change". Since July 2015, transgender people in Ireland can self-declare their gender for the purpose of updating passports, driving licences, obtaining new birth certificates, and getting married. Both male and female same-sex sexual activity have been legal in the state since 1993. Government recognition of LGBT rights in Ireland has expanded greatly over the past two decades. Homosexuality was decriminalised in 1993, and most forms of discrimination based on sexual orientation are now outlawed. Ireland also forbids incitement to hatred based on sexual orientation.

In 2015, a survey of 1,000 individuals in Ireland found that 78% of people supported same-sex marriage and 71% of people thought that same-sex couples should be allowed to adopt, this is in contrast to the same-sex marriage referendum result of the same year where 62% of voters supported same-sex marriage. A 2013 survey showed that 73% of Irish people agreed that "same-sex marriage should be allowed in the Constitution". Earlier, a 2008 survey showed that 84% of Irish people supported civil marriage or civil partnerships for same-sex couples, with 58% supporting full marriage rights in registry offices. The number who believed same-sex couples should only be allowed to have civil partnerships fell from 33% to 26%. A March 2011 The Sunday Times poll showed support for full civil marriage rights at 73%.

In July 2010, the Oireachtas passed the Civil Partnership and Certain Rights and Obligations of Cohabitants Act 2010, recognising civil partnerships between same-sex couples. The bill passed all stages in the lower house (Dáil), without the need for a vote, and by a margin of 48 votes to 4 in the Seanad (Senate). The bill was supported by all parties, although individual politicians criticised the legislation. Since the civil partnership legislation has been fully enacted and implemented from the start of 2011, gay and lesbian couples have been able to register their relationship before a registrar. The bill was signed by President Mary McAleese on 19 July 2010. The Minister for Justice signed the commencement order for the act on 23 December 2010, and it came into force on 1 January 2011. Due to the three-month waiting period for all civil ceremonies in Ireland, it had been expected that the first civil partnership ceremonies would take place in April. However, the legislation does provide a mechanism for exemptions to be sought through the courts, and the first partnership, which was between two men, was registered on 7 February 2011. The first publicly celebrated Irish civil partnership under the Act took place in Dublin on 5 April 2011. On 6 April 2015, the Children and Family Relationships Act 2015 was signed into law, amending (among other acts) the Adoption Act 2010, and on 19 July 2017 the Adoption (Amendment) Act 2017 was signed into law. These laws amended Irish adoption law to enable same-sex couples to adopt children.

In June 2017, Leo Varadkar, who came out as gay in 2015, was appointed as Ireland's Taoiseach (Head of Government), and thus became the fourth openly gay head of state/government in the world.

Legality of same-sex sexual activity

Same-sex sexual activity was decriminalised in 1993. This was the result of a campaign by Senator David Norris and the Campaign for Homosexual Law Reform which led to a ruling in 1988 that Irish laws prohibiting male homosexual activities were in contravention of the European Convention on Human Rights. The Campaign for Homosexual Law Reform was founded in the 1970s to fight for the decriminalisation of male homosexuality, its founding members including Senator Norris and future Presidents of Ireland Mary McAleese and Mary Robinson. Prior to 1993, certain laws dating from the nineteenth century rendered male homosexual acts illegal. The relevant legislation was the 1861 Offences Against the Person Act, and the 1885 Criminal Law (Amendment) Act, both enacted by the Parliament of the United Kingdom before Irish independence, and having been repealed in England and Wales in 1967, Scotland in 1980 and Northern Ireland in 1982.

In 1983, David Norris took a case to the Supreme Court seeking to challenge the constitutionality of these laws but was unsuccessful. In its Norris v. Attorney General judgement (delivered by a 3–2 majority), the court referred to the "Christian nature of [the Irish] State" and argued that criminalisation served public health and the institution of marriage.

In 1988, Norris took a case to the European Court of Human Rights to argue that Irish law was incompatible with the European Convention on Human Rights. The court, in the case of Norris v. Ireland, ruled that the criminalisation of male homosexuality in the Republic violated Article 8 of the Convention, which guarantees the right to privacy in personal affairs. The Oireachtas (Irish Parliament) decriminalised male homosexuality five years later, when the Minister for Justice, Maire Geoghegan-Quinn, in the 1992–1994 Fianna Fáil—Labour Coalition Government included decriminalisation with an equal age of consent (an equal age of consent was not required by the ECHR ruling) in a bill to deal with various sexual offences. None of the parties represented in the Oireachtas opposed decriminalisation. Coincidentally, the task of signing the bill decriminalising male homosexual acts fell to the then President of Ireland, Mary Robinson, an outspoken defender of gay rights who as a barrister and Senior Counsel had represented Norris in his Supreme Court and European Court of Human Rights case.

Apology
On 19 June 2018, as a result of a Labour Party motion proposed by Ged Nash, Taoiseach Leo Varadkar issued a public apology to members of the LGBT community for the suffering and discrimination they faced from the Irish state prior to the legalisation of homosexuality in 1993. Speaking to the Oireachtas, he said:

Justice Minister Charles Flanagan also issued an apology to members of the LGBT community who suffered as a result of the criminalisation of homosexuality, saying:

Recognition of same-sex relationships

Civil partnerships
Prior to the legalisation of same-sex marriage, civil partnership was permitted. A civil partnership bill was presented to the Cabinet on 24 June 2009 and was published on 26 June. Although most LGBT advocacy groups cautiously welcomed the legislation, there had been criticisms of the proposal. One major criticism stated that the legislation effectively enshrined discrimination in law insofar as separate contractual arrangements with greater privileges continued to exist for opposite-sex marriages concurrent to lesser arrangements for those wishing to take out civil partnerships. In particular, the denial of the right to apply to adopt to couples with a civil partnership had been cited as particularly discriminatory.

The bill passed all stages in Dáil Éireann on 1 July 2010 with cross-party support resulting in it passing without a vote, and passed by a margin of 48 votes to 4 in the Seanad (Senate) on 9 July 2010. It granted same-sex couples several rights then only granted to married couples, but did not recognise children raised by same-sex couples as being their children. Irish law only allowed gay people to adopt children as individuals, while allowing same-sex couples to jointly foster. It also granted cohabitants, both gay and straight, who have lived together for at least five years limited rights in an opt-out scheme where a former partner could apply to court on the breakdown of a relationship to make the other former partner provide financial support to him/her. The bill was signed into law by President Mary McAleese on 19 July, officially becoming the Civil Partnership and Certain Rights and Obligations of Cohabitants Act 2010.

The ability to enter into a civil partnership ended on 16 November 2015.

Marriage
Same-sex marriage is legal in Ireland, following approval of a referendum on 22 May 2015 which amended the Constitution of Ireland to provide that marriage is recognised irrespective of the sex of the partners. The measure was signed into law by President Michael D. Higgins as the Thirty-fourth Amendment of the Constitution of Ireland on 29 August 2015. The Marriage Act 2015, passed by the Oireachtas on 22 October 2015 and signed into law by the Presidential Commission on 29 October 2015, gave legislative effect to the amendment.

Same-sex marriage became legally recognised in Ireland on 16 November 2015 and the first marriage ceremonies of same-sex couples occurred on 17 November 2015.

Background to legalisation of same-sex marriage
The Irish courts first dealt with the case of same-sex marriage in the case of Foy v. An t-Ard Chláraitheoir & Ors. In that case, Dr Lydia Foy, a transgender woman, sought a finding that she was born female but suffered from a congenital disability and claimed that the existing legal regime infringed her constitutional rights to marry a biological man. In support of her claim, she relied on case law from the ECHR. Judge McKechnie J noted that in Ireland it was crucial that parties to a marriage be of the opposite biological sex. The judge noted that Article 12 of the ECHR is equally predicated. Accordingly, he found that there was no sustainable basis for the applicant's submission that the law which prohibited her from marrying a party of the same biological sex as herself was a violation of her constitutional right to marry. The judge concluded that the right to marry is not absolute and has to be evaluated in the context of several other rights including the rights of society. Therefore, the state is entitled to hold the view which is espoused and evident from its laws.

The Irish Supreme Court returned Foy's case to the High Court in 2005 to consider the issues in light of the Goodwin v United Kingdom decision of the ECHR. Foy had also issued new proceedings in 2006 relying on a new ECHR Act, which gave greater effect to the European Convention on Human Rights in Irish law. The two cases were consolidated and were heard in April 2007. Foy stressed the Goodwin decision where the European Court of Human Rights had found that the UK had breached the rights of a transgender woman, including her right to marry. McKechnie J was very reproachful of the government in his judgment and asserted that, because there is no express provision in the Civil Registration Act, which was enacted after the Goodwin decision, it must be questioned as to whether the State deliberately refrained from adopting any remedial measures to address the ongoing problems. He emphasised that Ireland is very much isolated within the member states of the Council of Europe with regards to these matters. The judge concluded that by reason of the absence of any provision which would enable the acquired identity of Foy to be legally recognised in this jurisdiction, the state is in breach of its positive obligations under Art 8 of the Convention. He issued a declaration that Irish law was incompatible with the ECHR and added that he would have found a breach of Foy's right to marry as well if it had been relevant.

Fine Gael, the Labour Party, Fianna Fáil, Sinn Féin, the Socialist Party, and the Green Party all support the right of marriage for same-sex couples.

Marriage Equality referendum

The new Fine Gael-Labour Government agreed to establish a Constitutional Convention to consider same-sex marriage among other things. On 2 July 2013, the Constitutional Convention delivered the formal report to the Oireachtas, which had four months to respond.

On 5 November 2013, it announced that a referendum to allow same-sex marriage would be held in the first half of 2015. On 19 February 2015, Taoiseach Enda Kenny announced that the Marriage Equality referendum would take place on Friday 22 May 2015. The referendum passed by a majority of 62.7% and added the wording "Marriage may be contracted in accordance with law by two persons without distinction as to their sex" to the Irish Constitution.

Adoption and parenting

Irish adoption law allows for applications to adopt children by married couples, cohabiting couples or single applicants. The legalisation of same-sex marriage in Ireland, in conjunction with the passage of the Children and Family Relationships Act 2015 and the Adoption (Amendment) Act 2017 means that same-sex couples are in law permitted to adopt.

A single gay person or one partner of a couple may apply and a same-sex couple may submit a joint application to foster children. Additionally, lesbian couples have access to IVF and assisted insemination treatment. In January 2014, Minister for Justice and Equality Alan Shatter announced that the Government of Ireland would bring in laws by the end of the year to extend guardianship, custody, and access rights to the non-biological parents of children in same-sex relationships and children born through surrogacy and sperm and egg donation.

On 21 January 2015, the government announced that a revised draft would give cohabiting couples and those in civil partnerships full adoption rights. The bill was set to become law before the May same-sex marriage referendum. The bill was published on 19 February 2015, ratified by both houses of the Oireachtas by 30 March 2015 and was signed into law on 6 April 2015, becoming the Children and Family Relationships Act 2015. Key provisions of the Act (including spouses, stepparents, civil partners and cohabiting partners being able to apply to become guardians of a child) went into effect on 18 January 2016.

On 5 May 2016, James Reilly, Minister for Children and Youth Affairs, announced that the Irish Government had approved the publication of a new adoption bill. The bill would amend the Adoption Act 2010 and the Children and Family Relationships Act 2015 and give legislative effect to the Thirty-first Amendment of the Constitution of Ireland (the children referendum). The purposes of the bill are to allow children to be adopted by their foster carers, where they have cared for the child for at least 18 months, and to allow two people regardless of marital status to adopt children, thus granting married same-sex couples the right to adopt. The bill also allows for the adoption of a child by civil partners and cohabiting couples and gives children a greater say in the adoption process, among many other reforms to the adoption system. The bill passed the Dáil on 30 November 2016, and received approval by the Seanad on 13 June 2017. The bill was signed into law by President Michael D. Higgins on 19 July 2017, becoming the Adoption (Amendment) Act 2017. The commencement order was signed by the Minister for Children and Youth Affairs, Katherine Zappone, on 18 October and the law went into effect the following day.

In January 2019, the Minister for Employment Affairs and Social Protection, Regina Doherty, announced that the government had published a bill that would amend the Civil Registration Act 2004 and allow lesbian couples who have had donor-assisted children in an Irish fertility clinic to register as their parents.  Under the changes, parents may choose the labels "mother" and "father" or instead the term "parents", meaning that the non-biological mother would be able to legally register as a co-parent. It passed the Daíl in March 2019, and the Seanad in May 2019. The Civil Registration Act 2019 was signed into law by President Michael D. Higgins on 23 May 2019, which is the fourth anniversary of the same-sex marriage referendum. It came into effect immediately. This legislation does not apply to Irish lesbian couples who have had donor-assisted children abroad or who have used reciprocal IVF (where one mother gives the eggs and the other mother carries the pregnancy; the non-birth mother is actually the biological mother). In these two cases, the couple must generally complete an adoption process. LGBT activist Ranae von Meding has two daughters with her wife Audrey through reciprocal IVF. She has been lobbying for legislation which would recognise all families regardless of how or where the child was conceived. Von Meding has started a petition on Uplift.ie which as of early September 2019 had received over 22,000 signatures in support. The Irish Independent reported in November 2019 that a fertility clinic in Dublin was offering reciprocal IVF services to lesbian couples.

In March 2021, a female same-sex couple from County Cork was the first to be recognised as parents on their own child's birth certificate in Ireland - despite the law legally being passed and implemented just over 5 years ago.

Discrimination protections
Discrimination on the basis of sexual orientation is outlawed by the Employment Equality Act, 1998 and the Equal Status Act, 2000. These laws forbid discrimination in any of the following areas: employment, vocational training, advertising, collective agreements, the provision of goods and services, and other publicly available opportunities. Additionally, while gender identity is not explicitly included in these two acts, it has been interpreted as being covered under the category of sex and disability.

Some protections provided remain uneven. As pointed out at page 26 in "Review, the Journal of the Public Service Executive Union, July/August 2014", Section 81E (5) of the Pensions Act 1990 prevents pensioners who retired more than one year before the 2010 civil partnership law from challenging the refusal of a survivor's pension for their civil partner.

Despite the passage of the Marriage Equality Amendment, the Labour Minister for Public Expenditure and Reform, Brendan Howlin, told the Dáil that he will not allow, for example, a gay man, who opted not to give a (meaningless) pension benefit to his wife in 1984, the right to opt to give a pension benefit to his husband in 2015 the first opportunity he could have done so. This would remain the case even if the gay man paid the same pension contributions as his heterosexual colleague. This decision was condemned in a leading article and opinion piece in the Irish Examiner on 24 June 2015 as being contrary to the spirit of the Marriage Referendum but remains government policy.

The Prohibition of Incitement to Hatred Act, 1989 outlaws incitement to hatred based on sexual orientation. The penalties for violating this law are a fine not exceeding £1,000 or imprisonment for a term not exceeding 6 months or both on the first offense, or on conviction on indictment, a fine not exceeding £10,000 or imprisonment for a term not exceeding 2 years or both. The Act defines the term "hatred" as follows:
 In October 2022, the Irish Cabinet in government formally signed off on protecting transgender individuals from hate crimes within Ireland - by explicitly including "gender identity" to the list which sexual orientation is already explicitly included since 1989.

On 3 June 2015, the Government Cabinet debated an amendment to the Employment Equality Act, 1998. The amendment would remove the provision in the Act allowing religious-run schools to dismiss teachers and staff on the sole basis of their sexual orientation and/or gender identity. On 11 July 2015, the bill passed the lower house, and on 9 August 2015 it passed the upper house. On 16 August 2015, the Irish President signed the bill into law, and the legislation went into effect immediately.

Military service
Lesbian, gay and bisexual people can serve openly in the Irish Defence Forces. Discrimination on the basis of sexual orientation is illegal.

There has been no preclusion since 1993 when male homosexuality was decriminalised in the Republic of Ireland. Since 1993, there has been significant change to make sure that there was no discrimination in terms of public policy. At the same time as an equal age of consent was introduced for heterosexual and homosexual persons, the Irish Defence Forces announced that they would be treating heterosexual and homosexual members equally. Relationships between senior and junior ranks would continue to be forbidden, as is common in most militaries. There would also be no harassment of gay officers and no questioning of members about their sexuality. The Irish Independent wrote in 1993 that:

Information regarding sexual orientation is not sought from personnel wishing to enlist in the Defence Forces. The Defence Forces have a code on interpersonal relationships and guidelines in relation to discrimination.

Transgender rights

On 19 October 2007, Dr. Lydia Foy won her case in the High Court which ruled that the failure to allow her to obtain a new birth certificate recording her gender as female was in breach of her rights under the ECHR. The government appealed this decision but dropped its appeal in June 2010 and stated it would introduce legislation in the future. A new government took office in February 2011 and following the report of an advisory committee in July 2011, the Minister responsible announced that the government would introduce gender recognition legislation as soon as possible. No legislation had been introduced by February 2013 and Foy commenced new legal proceedings seeking to enforce the decision made by the High Court in 2007. In June 2014, a gender recognition bill was announced and in September 2014, the government stated that it would be published by the end of the year. The bill was introduced on 19 December 2014. On 15 July 2015, the Gender Recognition Act 2015 with major amendments passed both houses of the Oireachtas and President Michael D. Higgins signed the bill into law on 22 July 2015. The law allows legal gender changes without the requirement of medical intervention or assessment by the state. Such change is possible through self-determination for any person aged 18 or over, resident in Ireland and registered on Irish registers. The law came into effect on 8 September 2015.

On 29 November 2019, Minister for Employment Affairs and Social Protection Regina Doherty published a report on reviewing the 2015 gender recognition law, including recommendations to make legal gender recognition available to 16- and 17-year-olds on the basis of self-declaration with parental consent.

In April 2019, Glitter Hole's Drag Storytime event was cancelled by Dún Laoghaire–Rathdown County Council, initially claiming it was "not age-appropriate", and later claiming it was due to the high level of homophobic abuse on social media.

In August 2022, the Irish Rugby Football Union announced a ban on transgender women competing in contact rugby. Transgender men are still allowed to compete if they sign a "written consent". In a statement, the IRFU said transgender women had "options to remain active in the game, such as non-contact playing formats (tag/touch rugby), refereeing, coaching, and volunteering, underlining that the IRFU values their on-going involvement in the game." The move was condemned by several LGBT organisations.

In November 2022, charity network Transgender Europe found that wait times for access to a first appointment for gender affirming healthcare in Ireland ranged from 2.5 years to 10 years. It further found that Ireland had only one public trans health provider, which was severely understaffed, and that patients seeking care there were reportedly denied for reasons including being on social welfare, having a diagnosis of ADHD, or not answering a series of "highly sexualized questions" in "the right way", leading many Irish trans people to turn to alternative methods of securing healthcare including the private sector and self-administering hormone therapy. Advocacy group Trans and Intersex Pride Dublin's response was to advocate for an informed consent model of healthcare access, saying "Trans people should be empowered to make decisions about their transition themselves".

Conversion therapy
Conversion therapy has a negative effect on the lives of LGBT people, and can lead to low self-esteem, depression and suicide ideation.
 
In March 2018, Senator Fintan Warfield (Sinn Féin) introduced a bill to Seanad Éireann to ban conversion therapy on LGBT people. Under the proposed bill, individuals found guilty of performing conversion therapies could be fined up to 10,000 euros and face up to a year in prison. The bill does not ban practices that provide assistance, acceptance and understanding to LGBT youth or people otherwise questioning their sexuality. The legislation has received the support of the Irish Council of Psychotherapy and many politicians and lawmakers. Some politicians further described conversion therapy as the gay equivalent of female genital mutilation.

The bill passed its second reading in Seanad Éireann on 2 May 2018. It lapsed with the dissolution of Dáil Éireann and Seanad Éireann in 2020, but was later restored in September of that year. As of April 2022, it remains stalled in the Seanad.

The Fianna Fáil–Fine Gael–Green coalition formed after the 2020 Irish general election has pledged in its Programme for Government to introduce a ban on conversion therapy. Research commissioned on potential legislation is due to be published sometime in 2022.

Sex education
The current sex education classes in Ireland have been described by many students and teachers as "archaic", "inadequate" and "biased", as well as "largely religious based", with reports of non-virgin students being humiliated, and LGBT issues never mentioned. In April 2018, the Dáil Éireann approved the Provision of Objective Sex Education Bill 2018, in its second reading, that would modify Ireland's sex education classes. The new classes would cover issues such as consent, the use of contraceptives, abortion, LGBT issues and sexuality. However, the legislation lapsed with the dissolution of the Oireachtas in 2020.

Health and blood donation
In January 2017, the Irish Blood Transfusion Service (IBTS) replaced a lifetime ban on donations from males who have had anal or oral sex with another male with a 12-month ban. This followed intense campaigning on the issue by activists over a number of years, including a judicial review challenge to the policy in the Irish High Court.

On 27 July 2015, Tomás Heneghan, a 23-year-old University of Limerick student and journalist from Galway began a legal challenge in the High Court against the permanent deferral imposed on MSM (men who have sex with men) donors. He argued that the questionnaire and interview process used by the IBTS does not adequately assess the risk of disease transmission posed by his donation. He claimed this is in breach of EU law. He said that both failed to consider the length of time between a donor's last sexual experience and the end of a "window period" in which infections are sometimes not detected. Heneghan's previous sexual activity posed no risk of infection, according to HSE-approved advice and he said the service had no evidence upon which it could legitimately impose a lifelong ban on him donating blood.

Following several adjournments of the case to allow the blood service and the Department of Health to examine and develop the donation policies, in late June 2016 the Irish Blood Transfusion Service recommended that the lifetime ban on MSM be reduced to a 12-month ban. Later that week, Minister for Health Simon Harris agreed to the recommendations and announced the reduction would take place. However, no timeline was initially reported for the implementation of the new policies.

On 26 July 2016, Heneghan dropped his High Court challenge against the service as an end to the lifetime deferral on MSM blood donors had been announced in the interim. Heneghan then wrote about his experiences of challenging the ban in a number of national media outlets. He also appeared on TV3's Ireland AM show to speak about his case.

On 2 October 2016, it was reported that Minister Harris would implement the new policy from 16 January 2017, almost seven months after he announced the policy change. On 16 January 2017, Heneghan (now 25) attended a blood donation clinic in D'Olier Street, Dublin and became the first man who has had sex with another man to donate blood openly in the Republic of Ireland since the lifetime deferral policy was first introduced in the 1980s. However, he also criticised the new 12-month deferral policy on MSM and called on Ireland's Health Minister to initiate a review of the IBTS and replace the 12-month deferral period for MSM with no deferral or a 3-month deferral on all donors following sexual intercourse.

Previously, in August 2013, Heneghan had alleged that the Irish Blood Transfusion Service had discriminated against him despite his assertion that he had never had oral or anal sex with another man.

On 20 May 2019, Heneghan (now 27) initiated a fresh legal challenge in the High Court against the blanket deferral on men who have had oral or anal sex with another man in the previous 12-month period. Heneghan argues that the questionnaire does not enable the IBTS to make a full evaluation of the level of risk presented by an individual donor due to their sexual behaviour. He also states that according to the IBTS's own website, there is a window period following infection during which HIV and hepatitis may not be detected in the blood and that this window is seven days for HIV and 16 days for hepatitis. He claims that a far less onerous restriction could be imposed rather than the 12-month deferral, which would protect blood recipients. He claims the decision to place an "automatic deferral" on him is unlawful and in breach of EU law and European communities regulations on the quality and safety of human blood products and that the policy is disproportionate, discriminates against homosexual and bisexual men, and breaches his constitutional rights and rights under the European Convention on Human Rights.

On 28 March 2022, the deferral period was reduced further to 4 months. From 28 November 2022, an individual risk assessment system has been in operation, resulting in blood donations from all prospective blood donors, regardless of orientation or gender, being accepted on the condition they have not engaged in anal sex with a new partner, or multiple partners, in the previous 4 months.

PrEP programme
In November 2019, the Ministry of Health established a PrEP programme, called a "gamechanger" by campaigners. Under the regulations, those who attend an approved service and are found to be at substantial risk of HIV and meet the clinical eligibility criteria will be eligible for PrEP free of charge, dispensed through community pharmacies. PrEP can significantly reduce the risk of infection among HIV-negative people at high risk.

Living conditions

Ireland is notable for its quick and drastic change in attitudes and public perception toward LGBT people, homosexuality and same-sex relationships. Up until the 1970s, the climate for LGBT people was one of high homophobia and public antipathy (and to an extent, this is still the case in certain contexts today, as many LGBT youth still experience bullying). LGBT individuals would mostly either stay in the closet, move to England, or commit suicide. In the 1970s, small LGBT groups began to emerge and organise politically. Among them was the Campaign for Homosexual Law Reform, founded by David Norris. The killing of Declan Flynn, a thirty-year-old gay man, on 10 September 1982 led to Ireland's first LGBT public march, held in Dublin's Fairview Park, the scene of the crime. Over the following years, LGBT groups and activists began to slowly enter the public eye and raise awareness of their cause and movement. In 1993, Ireland officially decriminalised homosexuality, celebrated as a landmark victory by LGBT groups, which had filed suit up to the European Court of Human Rights to strike down the ban. By the early 2000s, societal attitudes were becoming increasingly more accepting. Anti-discrimination laws covering sexual orientation were enacted, civil partnerships were legalised in 2011, granting same-sex couples several legal rights, and transgender transition laws were relaxed, allowing transgender people the right to change their legal gender on official documents. In May 2015, in a historic vote, the Irish people voted to legalise same-sex marriage, becoming the first country in the world to legalise it through a public vote. Societal change towards the LGBT community has been attributed to, among others, a decline in Catholicism in Ireland, which was previously "omnipotent" and played a big influence in both public and private life.

Opinion polls have shown raising levels of support for LGBT rights and same-sex marriage. According to a 2012 poll, 73% of Irish people agreed that same-sex marriage should be legalised. The 2015 Eurobarometer found that 80% of Irish people supported same-sex marriage. 15% were opposed.

Numerous LGBT events and venues can be found throughout Ireland. Dublin Pride is an annual pride parade held on the last Saturday of June in the capital city of Dublin. It is Ireland's largest public LGBT event. In 2018, an estimated 60,000 people attended. Other events include the Dublin Gay Theatre Festival, the GAZE International LGBT Film Festival Dublin and Mr Gay Ireland. Outside of Dublin, there are also visible, albeit smaller, LGBT scenes in Cork, Galway, Limerick, and Waterford. There are various gay or gay-friendly pubs, restaurants, clubs, bars and saunas all over Ireland.

The 2019 Eurobarometer showed that 83% of Irish people believed gay and bisexual people should enjoy the same rights as heterosexual people, and 79% supported same-sex marriage.

Summary table

See also

 LGBT rights in Europe
 LGBT rights in the European Union
 Campaign for Homosexual Law Reform (Ireland)
 BeLonG To (BeLonG To Youth Services)
 Outhouse Dublin LGBT+ Community and Resource Centre 
 Gay and Lesbian Equality Network (GLEN)
 List of Laws and Reports on Gay and Lesbian Rights in Ireland
 Same-sex marriage in the Republic of Ireland

References

External links

Employment Equity Act, 1998. www.irishstatutebook.ie
Equal Status Act, 2000. www.irishstatutebook.ie
Norris v. A.G. – [1983] IESC 3; [1984] IR 36 (22 April 1983) – Supreme Court judgement affirming the law criminalising homosexuality
Norris v. Ireland – 10581/83 [1988] ECHR 22 (26 October 1988) – European Court of Human Rights judgement overturning the Supreme Court ruling
To Form a More Perfect Union: Marriage Equality News
Foy v An t-Ard Chláraitheoir & Ors — [2007] IEHC 470 (19 October 2007) — High Court judgement holding Ireland's failure to recognise sex changes as incompatible with the European Convention on Human Rights
"Out at last!", 8 June 2008.

 
Irish laws